Kasson may refer to:

People
 Burt Z. Kasson (1877–1943), New York politician
 John A. Kasson (1822–1910), Iowa politician and lawyer
 Kasson Crooker, electronic music composer from Boston, Massachusetts

Places in the United States
 Kasson, Indiana
 Kasson, Minnesota
 Kasson, West Virginia
 Kasson Brook, Pennsylvania
 Kasson Township, Michigan